National Health were an English progressive rock band associated with the Canterbury scene. Founded in 1975, the band featured members of keyboardist Dave Stewart's band Hatfield and the North and Alan Gowen's band Gilgamesh, including guitarists Phil Miller and Phil Lee and bassist Mont Campbell as original members. The band was named after Stewart's National Health spectacles. Bill Bruford (previously of Yes and King Crimson) was the initial drummer, but was soon replaced by Pip Pyle. Campbell was replaced by Neil Murray and then John Greaves. Alan Gowen left the group before its first album (although he appeared on it as a guest musician), but returned for their final tours, replacing Dave Stewart, who resigned after their second album.  Amanda Parsons sang with the group in its original lineup but also appeared on the first album only as a guest; the group never had another full-time vocalist, although Richard Sinclair appeared a few times as a guest vocalist, and Greaves sang on one track of the second album and occasionally in concerts. Guitarist Phil Miller was National Health's only constant member.

They toured extensively and released their first album, National Health, in 1978. Although it was created during the rise of punk rock, the album is characterized by lengthy, mostly instrumental compositions. Their second record, Of Queues and Cures, which included Henry Cow associates Peter Blegvad (recitation on "Squarer For Maud") and Georgie Born (cello), is held as one of the "best records ever" on the Gnosis website. National Health continued performing live until winter 1980, but disbanded without recording another album.

After the May 1981 death of Gowen, the Queues lineup of Stewart, Miller, Greaves and Pyle reunited to record the album D.S. Al Coda, a set of compositions by Gowen, most previously unrecorded. The original albums and additional archival material have subsequently been released on CD.

The intro of National Health's "Binoculars" was used as a sample on American rock band Deftones' "Black Moon".

Line-ups

Discography

Studio albums
 National Health (1978)
 Of Queues and Cures (1978)
 D.S. Al Coda (1982)

Other releases
 Complete (1990; all three studio albums plus bonus tracks)
 Missing Pieces (1996; archival material)
 Playtime (2001; live recordings from 1979)
 Dreams Wide Awake (2005; selected tracks from the first two studio albums)

Filmography
 2015: Romantic Warriors III: Canterbury Tales (DVD)

References

External links
Biography at Calyx
Discography

Canterbury scene
English progressive rock groups
Jazz fusion ensembles
Musical groups established in 1975
Musical groups disestablished in 1980
1975 establishments in England
1980 disestablishments in England